John Coleman Hufnagel (born September 13, 1951) is the president of the Calgary Stampeders of the Canadian Football League (CFL). He was previously the Stampeders' head coach and played quarterback for fifteen professional seasons in the CFL and National Football League (NFL). Prior to his hiring to the Stampeders on December 3, 2007, he was the offensive coordinator of the New York Giants of the NFL.

Playing career
Hufnagel was an All-American at Penn State University in 1972, where he was the starting quarterback for three seasons  with a 26–3 record under head coach Joe Paterno. As a junior, he was instrumental in the Nittany Lions' 30–6 Cotton Bowl victory in Dallas over the University of Texas. He led a backfield which included Franco Harris and Lydell Mitchell and Penn State finished 11–1, fifth in the final AP poll.

In 1972, Hufnagel became the first Nittany Lion quarterback to pass for more than 2,000 yards in a season. His 2,039 passing yards set Penn State's single-season record for passing yards (since broken) and he remains among the top 10 in most major career passing categories. He finished sixth in the Heisman Trophy voting that year, won by Johnny Rodgers of Nebraska, (and won the following year by Penn State running back John Cappelletti). Hufnagel's final game as a collegian was the Sugar Bowl in New Orleans, a 14–0 shutout loss to the University of Oklahoma on New Year's Eve. Without Cappelletti due to the flu, the Penn State running game was weak and the Sooner defense dominated the game.

A 14th-round selection (348th overall) of the Denver Broncos in the 1973 NFL Draft, Hufnagel spent three seasons with the Broncos, then twelve more in the Canadian Football League with the Calgary Stampeders  Saskatchewan Roughriders (1980–1983, 1987), and Winnipeg Blue Bombers

Coaching career

Canadian Football League
Hufnagel began his coaching career as a player-coach for the Canadian Football League's Saskatchewan Roughriders in 1987. From 1990–1996 Hufnagel was the offensive coordinator for the Calgary Stampeders, where he helped future Pro Bowlers Doug Flutie and Jeff Garcia earn All-CFL honors.

Arena Football League
In 1997, Hufnagel became head coach and general manager of the Arena Football League’s New Jersey Red Dogs. In two seasons there, he posted a 17–11 record.

National Football League
After two seasons (1999, 2000) as the quarterbacks coach for the Cleveland Browns, Hufnagel was named the quarterbacks coach of the Indianapolis Colts, where he coached Peyton Manning to a 62.7 percent completion percentage and for 4,131 yards passing. He spent the 2002 season as the quarterbacks coach on Tom Coughlin’s staff in Jacksonville. That year, quarterback Mark Brunell threw only seven interceptions in 416 pass attempts, and an 85.7 quarterback rating. He spent the 2003 season with the Super Bowl champion New England Patriots. Under Hufnagel's tutelage, Tom Brady earned a second Super Bowl MVP award, completing 60.2 percent of his passes for 3,620 yards and 23 touchdowns.

Hufnagel became the offensive coordinator of the New York Giants in 2004, and molded them into one of the NFL's most potent offenses. Tiki Barber set a franchise rushing record two years in a row, and the Giants became only the fifth team in NFL history to have five different players score at least seven touchdowns. (Tiki Barber, Jeremy Shockey, Plaxico Burress, Amani Toomer and Brandon Jacobs). While Hufnagel is credited with the rapid development of quarterback Eli Manning, he is sometimes criticized for his often predictable play-calling and an inability to utilize his offensive play-makers effectively.

During the 2006 season, Hufnagel came under much criticism for being too pass-happy and abandoning the running game after the Giants trailed during games.  In addition, he was also questioned for having Manning throw the ball the third and sixth most passes in the league over 2005 and 2006 despite Tiki Barber clearly being the best player on offense.  In addition, his situational play-calling came under scrutiny, such as when running back Brandon Jacobs was removed from the game inside the five yard-line in two games, thus making the offense more predictable to opposing defenses.

Following a 30–7 defeat by the New Orleans Saints, Hufnagel was stripped of his duties as offensive coordinator.  A week later, it was revealed he was fired.

Return to the CFL 
On December 3, 2007, Hufnagel was hired as the head coach and general manager of the Calgary Stampeders. In his first season, he led the Stampeders to the Grey Cup title with a 22–14 victory over the Montreal Alouettes on November 23. For his performance in the 2008 CFL season, he was awarded the Annis Stukus Trophy as the CFL's coach of the year. Hufnagel got the Stamps back to the Grey Cup game to conclude the 2012 CFL season. The Stampeders lost the 100th Grey Cup game to the Toronto Argonauts 35-22. In the 2013 CFL season, Hufnagel and the Stampeders finished the season in 1st place with a 14-4 record. They lost the Western Final to Saskatchewan.

The following season, Hufnagel led the Stampeders to a 15-3 record, finishing first in the Western division and in the league. In the playoffs, the Calgary Stampeders faced the Edmonton Eskimos (who previously eliminated Saskatchewan) and defeated them 43-18, leading them to Calgary's second Grey Cup in three years. They would face the Hamilton Tiger-Cats in the 102nd Grey Cup and win the game 20-16 for Calgary's seventh Grey Cup championship.

Following the Stampeder's championship season of 2014, Hufnagel was awarded the Annis Stukus Trophy as the CFL coach of the year for the second time in his career. Later, Hufnagel announced he would step down as head coach after the following season to concentrate on his general manager duties, and named offensive coordinator and former Stamps quarterback Dave Dickenson as his successor. He is the second-winningest coach in Stampeders history, trailing only Wally Buono. He is also the ninth-winningest coach in CFL history, and has the most wins of any coach who spent his entire career with just one team. He was inducted into the Canadian Football Hall of Fame as a builder in 2020. He stepped down as general manager after the 2022 but retained his position as team president.

CFL coaching record

Personal life
Hufnagel earned a Bachelor of Science degree in marketing from Penn State University in 1973. Hufnagel and his wife, Sherry, live in Cochrane, Alberta. He has two daughters, Neely and Lindsey, and a son, Cole. He graduated from Montour High School in McKees Rocks, Pennsylvania, a suburb southwest of Pittsburgh.

See also
 List of NCAA major college football yearly passing leaders

References

External links
John Hufnagel's bio, www.giants.com

1951 births
Living people
American football quarterbacks
Players of American football from Pennsylvania
Penn State Nittany Lions football players
Denver Broncos players
American players of Canadian football
Canadian football quarterbacks
Calgary Stampeders general managers
Calgary Stampeders players
Saskatchewan Roughriders players
Sportspeople from the Pittsburgh metropolitan area
Winnipeg Blue Bombers players
Saskatchewan Roughriders coaches
Calgary Stampeders coaches
Cleveland Gladiators coaches
Cleveland Browns coaches
Indianapolis Colts coaches
Jacksonville Jaguars coaches
New England Patriots coaches
New York Giants coaches
People from Coraopolis, Pennsylvania
Canadian Football Hall of Fame inductees